The 1983–84 Denver Nuggets season was their 17th season, and their eighth in the NBA. The Nuggets head coach was Doug Moe and his assistant coach was Bill Ficke.

In the playoffs, the Nuggets lost to the Utah Jazz in five games in the First Round.

Draft picks

Roster

Regular season

Season standings

Notes
 z, y – division champions
 x – clinched playoff spot

Record vs. opponents

Game log

Playoffs

|- align="center" bgcolor="#ffcccc"
| 1
| April 17
| @ Utah
| L 121–123
| Kiki VanDeWeghe (33)
| Dan Issel (10)
| Rob Williams (8)
| Salt Palace10,255
| 0–1
|- align="center" bgcolor="#ccffcc"
| 2
| April 19
| @ Utah
| W 132–116
| Dan Issel (33)
| T. R. Dunn (10)
| Rob Williams (5)
| Salt Palace12,413
| 1–1
|- align="center" bgcolor="#ccffcc"
| 3
| April 22
| Utah
| W 121–117
| Alex English (29)
| T. R. Dunn (10)
| Alex English (6)
| McNichols Sports Arena14,681
| 2–1
|- align="center" bgcolor="#ffcccc"
| 4
| April 24
| Utah
| L 124–129
| Dan Issel (32)
| Alex English (10)
| Alex English (6)
| McNichols Sports Arena16,108
| 2–2
|- align="center" bgcolor="#ffcccc"
| 5
| April 26
| @ Utah
| L 111–127
| Dan Issel (25)
| Alex English (11)
| Alex English (9)
| Salt Palace12,731
| 2–3
|-

Awards, records, and honors
 T.R. Dunn, NBA All-Defensive Second Team
 On December 13, 1983, the Nuggets played in the highest scoring game in NBA history, losing to the Detroit Pistons 186-184.

Player statistics

Season

Playoffs

Transactions

References

 Nuggets on Basketball Reference

Denver Nuggets seasons
Den
Denver Nugget
Denver Nugget